is a town located in Nakatado District, Kagawa Prefecture, Japan. , the town had an estimated population of 22,124 in 10365 households and a population density of 270 persons per km².

Geography
Tadotsu is located in central Kagawa Prefecture. It borders the Sanuki Plain to the south and the scenic Setonaikai National Park to the north. The inhabited islands of Takamijima and Sanagishima of the Shiwaku Islands are located within the town borders.

Neighbouring municipalities 
Kagawa Prefecture
Marugame
 Zentsūji
Mitoyo

Climate
Tadotsu has a humid subtropical climate (Köppen climate classification Cfa) with very warm summers and cool winters. Some precipitation falls throughout the year, but the months from April through October have heavier rain.

Demographics
Per Japanese census data, the population of Tadotsu in 2020 is 22,445 people. Tadotsu has been conducting censuses since 1920.

History 
The area of Tadotsu was part of ancient Sanuki Province. During the Edo Period, the jin'ya of Tadotsu Domain, a subsidiary domain of  Marugame Domain was located in Tadotsu, which developed as a jōkamachi. Following the Meiji restoration, the town of Tadotsu was established with the creation of the modern municipalities system on February 15, 1890. Tadotsu annexed the village of Toyohara on May 10, 1942 and the villages of Shika andShirakata on May 3, 1954. On September 30, Tadotsu annexed the villages of Sanagishima and Takamijima.

Government
Tadotsu has a mayor-council form of government with a directly elected mayor and a unicameral town council of 14 members. Tadotsu contributes one member to the Kagawa Prefectural Assembly. In terms of national politics, the town is part of Kagawa 3rd district  of the lower house of the Diet of Japan.

Economy
Tadotsu has a mixed economy of agriculture and industry. Tadotsu Shipbuilding (affiliated company of Imabari Shipbuilding Group) and the Shikoku Railway Tadotsu vehicle maintenance factory are located in the town.

Education
Tadotsu has four public elementary schools and one public middle school operated by the town government, and one public high schools operated by the Kagawa Prefectural Board of Education. There is also one private high school.

Transportation

Railways 
 Shikoku Railway Company - Yosan Line
 -  
 Shikoku Railway Company - Dosan Line

Highways

Sister city relations
 - Putuo District, Shanghai, friendship city since November 19, 2001.

Local attractions
Dōryū-ji, 77th temple on the Shikoku Pilgrimage
Amagiri Castle, National Historic Site
Shorinji Kempo head dōjō

Noted people from Tadotsu
Masanori Yusa, Olympic gold medalist swimmer

References

External links

Official website 
Shorinji Kempo Official website in Japanese and English

Towns in Kagawa Prefecture
Tadotsu, Kagawa
Populated coastal places in Japan